The Lafayette County School District is a public school district based in Lafayette County, Mississippi (USA).

The district serves Abbeville, Paris, Taylor, and Tula, as well as most unincorporated rural areas in Lafayette County. The district incorporates a few outerlying sections of Oxford.

The district administration, middle school, and high school are along Commodore Drive in the city limits of Oxford.

Schools

All are in the Oxford city limits.
Lafayette High School (Grades 9-12)
Lafayette Middle School (Grades 7-8)
Lafayette Upper Elementary School (Grades 3-6) 
Lafayette Lower Elementary School (Grades K-2)

Demographics

2006-07 school year
There were a total of 2,394 students enrolled in the Lafayette County School District during the 2006–2007 school year. The gender makeup of the district was 47% female and 53% male. The racial makeup of the district was 29.20% African American, 69.13% White, 1.42% Hispanic, 0.13% Native American, and 0.13% Asian. 44.2% of the district's students were eligible to receive free lunch.

Previous school years

Accountability statistics

See also

List of school districts in Mississippi

References

External links
 

Education in Lafayette County, Mississippi
School districts in Mississippi
Oxford, Mississippi